William Tyler (June 5, 1806 – June 18, 1849) was an American prelate of the Roman Catholic Church who served as the first Bishop of Hartford (1844–1849).

Biography
One of eight children, Tyler was born in Derby, Vermont; his father was a farmer, and his mother was the sister of Daniel Barber and aunt of Virgil Horace Barber, both Protestant ministers who converted to the Catholic Church. The family moved to Claremont, New Hampshire, when William was a child. He converted to Catholicism at age fifteen or sixteen. He completed his classical course at the academy founded by his cousin Virgil in Claremont, and became a member of the household of Bishop Benedict Joseph Fenwick, S.J., in 1826 at Boston, Massachusetts, where he studied theology.

Tyler was ordained to the priesthood by Fenwick on June 3, 1829. He then served as a curate at Holy Cross Cathedral and did missionary work in Aroostook County, Maine, before becoming vicar general of the Diocese of Boston.

On November 28, 1843, Tyler was appointed the first Bishop of the newly erected Diocese of Hartford by Pope Gregory XVI. He received his episcopal consecration on March 17, 1844 from Bishop Fenwick, with Bishops Richard Vincent Whelan and Andrew Byrne serving as co-consecrators, at Assumption Cathedral in Baltimore, Maryland. Upon Tyler's arrival in Hartford the following April, the diocese included the entire states of Connecticut and Rhode Island, containing nearly 10,000 Catholics. Since there were only 600 Catholics in Hartford, he soon moved his residence to Providence, which had 2,000 Catholics. He designated Sts. Peter and Paul Church as his cathedral.

Tyler's friend and physician said that any stable would provide better protection against the seasons than the episcopal residence, and that the little house next to the sacristy "...could easily have been drawn by oxen from one end of Providence to the other". He dispensed with the use of a carriage and went everywhere on foot. Not a gifted orator, he carefully wrote his sermons and then read them to the congregation. He was a strict Temperance man, and his harangues against the purveyors of intoxicating drink did not make him popular with the wealthier citizens. The Bishop arranged for food to be distributed at his house every Monday to those in need. He continued to perform the services of a parish priest and went out on sick calls when he might easily have sent one of his two assistants, so as not to disappoint a parishioner or inconvenience his curates.

Tyler recruited clergy from All Hallows College in Ireland, and received financial assistance from the Society for the Propagation of the Faith in Lyons, France, and the Leopoldine Society in Austria. His already poor health further weakened by consumption, he received Bernard O'Reilly as a coadjutor bishop and later died from rheumatic fever, aged 45.

See also

 Catholic Church hierarchy
 Catholic Church in the United States
 Historical list of the Catholic bishops of the United States
 List of Catholic bishops of the United States
 Lists of patriarchs, archbishops, and bishops

References

External links
Roman Catholic Archdiocese of Hartford

1806 births
1849 deaths
Converts to Roman Catholicism from Anglicanism
19th-century Roman Catholic bishops in the United States
Roman Catholic bishops of Hartford
Catholic Church in Rhode Island
People from Derby, Vermont
Religious leaders from Rhode Island
Catholics from Vermont